Courtney Allison Moulton (born August 18, 1986) is an American fantasy author. She wrote the acclaimed and bestselling Angelfire which was published by Katherine Tegen Books, an imprint of HarperCollins.

Notable works 

 Angelfire novel series 
 Angelfire (2011)
 Wings of the Wicked (2012)
 Shadows in the Silence (2013)
 A Dance with Darkness (2013)
 Wardens of Eternity (2020)

References

Living people

Novelists from Texas
Women science fiction and fantasy writers
American fantasy writers
21st-century American women writers
Year of birth uncertain
1986 births